Emmanuel Fernandez (born 20 November 2001) is an English professional footballer who plays for Peterborough United, as a defender.

Career
Fernandez began his career with Brentford and Gillingham, and whilst at Gillingham spent time on loan at Sheppey United and Margate. At Margate he made 2 appearances, 1 in the Cup and 1 in the league.

After being released by Gillingham he played for Ramsgate, before signing a two-year contract with Peterborough United in July 2021. He made his debut on 2 April 2022 in a "surprise" selection in a 0–4 home defeat against Middlesbrough.

References

2001 births
Living people
English footballers
Gillingham F.C. players
Sheppey United F.C. players
Margate F.C. players
Ramsgate F.C. players
Peterborough United F.C. players
Isthmian League players
English Football League players
Association football defenders